Justin Mortelliti (born August 30, 1980 in Philadelphia, Pennsylvania) is an American actor, singer/songwriter and recording artist.

Early life
Mortelliti was born in Philadelphia, Pennsylvania. His family moved to Washington Township, Gloucester County, New Jersey in 1982, where he spent his childhood with his mother, Marilyn Mortelliti, father, Nicholas Mortelliti, older brother, Gregory and younger brother Adam.  He was raised Roman Catholic and graduated from Washington Township High School in 1998. Mortelliti began studying violin at the age of 8 and was also a competitive gymnast most of his childhood. Mortelliti's first theatrical experience was in a D.A.R.E. to keep kids off drugs program assembly where he was chosen by his 5th grade teacher to play the victim of a drug overdose. Upon entering middle school at Orchard Valley Middle School, Justin became drawn to musical theater, appearing on stage as a Dodo Bird in Alice in Wonderland, The Lion in The Wizard of Oz and Aladdin in Aladdin. In 8th grade, Justin auditioned for the role of Oliver in a local theater's production of the musical and won the title role. From there he moved on to his first professional theatrical performances at The Ritz Theatre when he appeared in Oliver, Gypsy and Oklahoma. Justin continued performing throughout high school in musicals and plays including, Bye Bye Birdie (as Randolph Macafee), The Pirates of Penzance (Frederic), Leader of the Pack (Jeff Barry) and Grease (Danny Zuko) and joined a local summer theater group called The Gloucester County Summer Drama Workshop. Around this time, Justin began writing music for fun. In 1996, a local talent agent spotted Justin in one of the school plays and he began auditioning professionally, leaving school on a regular basis to board a Greyhound bus to NYC for auditions.

Mortelliti was accepted into the acting conservatory Mason Gross School of the Arts at Rutgers University where he earned his BFA in acting and theater arts. He also studied in London, England at The London Academy of Theater.

Personal life
Mortelliti is married to fellow actor Mark Evans. and together they have one child, a daughter, Larsen Jean.

Career
In New York City, Mortelliti appeared  in Final Play at The Sanford Meisner Theater and played the role of Pippin in NewArt Theater Company's Production of the musical. Mortelliti briefly performed with the improv-comedy troop ‘The Grown-Up Playground’.

In Los Angeles, he appeared in Happy Days: The Musical at The Falcon Theatre, under the direction of Garry Marshall, Twist at The Avery Schreiber Theatre, and The House of Yes (Marty) with Priscilla Barnes at Stage 52. Mortelliti originated the role of Porter in the world premier of the new musical The Bedroom Window at The Odyssey Theatre for which he won a StageScene LA Award for Outstanding performance by a lead actor/musical. In 2008, Mortelliti played the role of Roger in the West Coast Regional Premier of the rock musical RENT. He then originated the role of Dylan Klebold in The Columbine Project which transferred to an Off-Broadway theater in NYC for which he won an Artistic Director's Achievement award for Best Lead Actor in a Play. He also originated the role of Jared in the World Premier play Expecting to Fly at The Elephant Theatre in Los Angeles, which he was runner up to Alfred Molina for a Ticket Holder Award - Best Actor in a Play. Mortelliti performed with the Los Angeles-based 'For the Record' appearing in their productions of Boogie Nights and Scorsese: American Crime Requiem which premiered at The Wallis in Beverly Hills in 2016. He played the role of Drew in the original Las Vegas cast of Rock of Ages which opened in 2012. Mortelliti appeared on Broadway in the original cast of 'Escape to Margaritaville' which opened in March 2018 and later that year starred opposite Dove Cameron as Christian in The New Group's production of Clueless: The Musical Off-Broadway. Justin originated the role of Mr. Darcy in the new musical Pride and Prejudice in December 2019, at Theatreworks Silicon Valley and was nominated Best Lead Actor in a Musical for the San Francisco Bay Area Critics Circle Awards.

Awards and Nominations
Mortelliti originated the role of Dylan Klebold in the Off-Broadway, World Premier of the play  ‘The Columbine Project’ in 2009 for which he won an Artistic Director's Achievement Award – Best Lead Actor in a Drama.

Mortelliti was nominated for Best Lead Actor in a Musical for his performance in the role of Mr. Darcy in 'Pride and Prejudice' at the San Francisco Bay Area Critics Circle Awards.

Music

Justin was discovered singing at a local mall by manager and producer Sam Riddle who was putting together a boy band called Nxt Level (originally called Groove). Justin performed with the group and recorded a partial album with producers Alain Bertoni and Cristian Hamm in Cologne, Germany. This was his first experience as a recording artist.

Justin also toured the US and Canada as the lead singer of Kidz Bop Live in the summer of 2008.

He released his first solo EP, ‘The Fall and Rise’ on January 1, 2007. ‘The Fall and Rise’ was recorded with producers John DeGrazio and Andrew Manzano. His song ‘The Fall’ was featured in the independent film ‘Dog Tags’ (TLA Releasing) and as the theme song for the webseries ‘Gossip Boy’. And his song ‘You Amaze Me’ was featured in the film ‘Eating Out: The Open Weekend’ (2011). In January 2013, ‘The Fall’ began spinning on regular rotation on 99.7 FM The Highway Vibe in and around Las Vegas and parts of Nevada, Arizona, and Southern California.

Mortelliti released two singles with singer Shannon Hunt under the pop duo Stefi & Pepper, ‘Big Hair’ on December 2, 2010 and ‘I Want Your Love’ on October 12, 2012.

Mortelliti was on the original cast recording for  the rock musical ‘The Bedroom Window’ which was released on August 28, 2012.

Mortelliti's 2nd solo EP, ‘The Prince of April’ was released in the summer of 2014 and produced by Bryan McAdams. The first single, ‘My Silver’ was released on June 10, 2014 and began getting radio play that same month. The song ‘Try’ from the EP was recorded with Jenny Delich (Delish) who appeared on the MTV reality series ‘The Real World: Explosion’ in 2014.

Mortelliti has released music videos for his songs ‘The Fall’ and ‘Know That I’ from the EP ‘The Fall and Rise’ and ‘My Silver’ from the EP ‘The Prince of April’. With Stefi & Pepper, Mortelliti has released music videos for the single ‘Big Hair’ and a cover of the Pink and Steven Tyler duet, ‘Misery’.  
 
Justin performed in a concert with the band ‘Foreigner’ singing lead vocals with Kelly Hanson at The Venetian in Las Vegas.

Film

Mortelliti has been in a number of independent films including Baptism (1998), Not the End of the World (2007), Queerspiracy! (2007), Negotiations (2007) where he was nominated at The Method Film Festival for Best Actor, Dog Tags (2007), The Lost Tribe (2009), Matchup (2011), Batman: Puppet Master (2012), Rehab (2012), Jew (2012), Casting (2013), and Fever (2022).

Mortelliti did the voice over and motion picture capture for the role of Clint aka Henry in the Video Game Bully

Mortelliti played the role of Zack in the sequel to The Collector (2009), the Major Motion Picture The Collection starring Josh Stewart and Emma Fitzpatrick and directed by Marcus Dunstan, which was released in theaters in 2012.

TV

Mortelliti has appeared in guest roles in the CBS TV series Numb3rs with Judd Hirsch and David Krumholtz in an episode called ‘Hot Shot’ which originally aired in 2006, the TV series  M.A.S.H. in 2012, 

He appeared as a member of the band of Victoria Justice in an episode of Nickelodeon's Victorious called ‘Tori Goes Platinum' that aired in 2012.

In 2017, Mortelliti appeared in guest roles in the Netflix TV series Orange is the New Black and a recurring role in 2018 in AMC's Turn: Washington's Spies.

In 2020, Mortelliti appeared in a guest starring role in the Lionsgate's Spectrum Original Series Manhunt: Lone Wolf. He also played the role of Mr. Darcy in Pride and Prejudice: A New Musical

In 2021, Mortelliti appeared in a guest starring role in the CBS series NCIS: New Orleans

References

External links
 

1980 births
Living people
21st-century American male actors
American male video game actors
American gay actors
American gay musicians
Male actors from New Jersey
People from Washington Township, Gloucester County, New Jersey
Washington Township High School (New Jersey) alumni
20th-century LGBT people
21st-century LGBT people